Toombs County is a county located in the east central portion of the U.S. state of Georgia. As of the 2020 census, the population was 27,030. The county seat is Lyons and the largest city is Vidalia. The county was created on August 18, 1905.

Toombs County is part of the Vidalia, Georgia Micropolitan Statistical Area.

History
Toombs County was founded as the 144th county in Georgia by the State Legislature on August 18, 1905 and organized on October 9 of that year. The county was originally formed from portions of Tattnall and Montgomery Counties; a small piece of Emanuel County was added in 1907 to give Toombs County its present-day boundaries.

The County is named for Robert Toombs, United States representative and senator. During the Civil War, Toombs also served in the Confederate Provisional Congress, as Secretary of State of the Confederate States, and a brigadier general in the Confederate Army.

Government
Toombs County is governed by a five-member Board of Commissioners, headed by David Sikes, the Chairman.  It is also governed by Alvie Kight Jr., who has been Sheriff since 1997.

Politics

Geography

The southern half of Toombs County, from south of Vidalia southeast to State Route 147, is located in the Altamaha River sub-basin of the larger river basin by the same name. The northern half of the county, centered on Lyons, is located in the Ohoopee River sub-basin of the Altamaha River basin.

Major highways

  U.S. Route 1
  U.S. Route 280
  State Route 4
  State Route 15
  State Route 29
  State Route 30
  State Route 56
  State Route 86
  State Route 130
  State Route 147
  State Route 152
  State Route 178
  State Route 292
  State Route 297
  State Route 298

Adjacent counties
 Emanuel County (north)
 Tattnall County (east)
 Appling County (south)
 Jeff Davis County (southwest)
 Montgomery County (west)
 Treutlen County (northwest)
 Candler County (northeast)

Demographics

2000 census
As of the census of 2000, there were 26,067 people, 9,877 households, and 6,825 families living in the county. There were 11,371 housing units at an average density of 31 per square mile (12/km2). The racial makeup of the county was 69.16% White, 24.15% Black or African American, 0.21% Native American, 0.47% Asian, 0.01% Pacific Islander, 5.34% from other races, and 0.66% from two or more races.  8.86% of the population were Hispanic or Latino of any race.

There were 9,877 households, out of which 34.70% had children under the age of 18 living with them, 48.70% were married couples living together, 15.60% had a female householder with no husband present, and 30.90% were non-families. 27.00% of all households were made up of individuals, and 10.60% had someone living alone who was 65 years of age or older.  The average household size was 2.59 and the average family size was 3.13.

In the county, the population was spread out, with 28.60% under the age of 18, 9.20% from 18 to 24, 27.80% from 25 to 44, 22.30% from 45 to 64, and 12.20% who were 65 years of age or older.  The median age was 34 years. For every 100 females, there were 91.30 males.  For every 100 females age 18 and over, there were 88.30 males.

The median income for a household in the county was $26,811, and the median income for a family was $34,478. Males had a median income of $26,988 versus $18,051 for females. The per capita income for the county was $14,252.  About 17.80% of families and 23.90% of the population were below the poverty line, including 33.80% of those under age 18 and 18.30% of those age 65 or over.

2010 census
As of the 2010 United States Census, there were 27,223 people, 10,375 households, and 7,109 families living in the county. The racial makeup of the county was 65.1% white, 24.9% black or African American, 0.7% Asian, 0.3% American Indian, 0.1% Pacific islander, 7.4% from other races, and 1.5% from two or more races. Those of Hispanic or Latino origin made up 11.2% of the population. In terms of ancestry, 17.6% were English, 11.9% were American, and 5.9% were Irish.

Of the 10,375 households, 37.4% had children under the age of 18 living with them, 45.3% were married couples living together, 18.3% had a female householder with no husband present, 31.5% were non-families, and 27.2% of all households were made up of individuals. The average household size was 2.59 and the average family size was 3.14. The median age was 36.0 years.

The median income for a household in the county was $31,635 and the median income for a family was $44,266. Males had a median income of $35,335 versus $26,893 for females. The per capita income for the county was $17,974. About 20.3% of families and 25.7% of the population were below the poverty line, including 34.7% of those under age 18 and 21.7% of those age 65 or over.

2020 census

As of the 2020 United States census, there were 27,030 people, 10,030 households, and 6,537 families residing in the county.

Cities and communities
 Lyons
 Ohoopee
 Santa Claus
 Vidalia

Notable people
 Mel Blount (football hall of famer and founder of Mel Blount Youth Home)
 Nick Eason (former NFL player and current NFL assistant defensive line coach)
 Craig Campbell (country music singer)
 Fred Stokes (former pro football player)
 Travares Tillman (professional football player)
 Don Collins (former professional baseball player)
 Paul Claxton (PGA tour professional golfer)
 Wally Moses (former professional baseball player)
 Algur H. Meadows (oilman, businessman)
 Iris Blitch (politician)
 Carl Simpson (former professional baseball player)
 Don Harris (journalist killed during Jonestown Massacre)
 Ben Utt (professional football player)
 Paul Anderson (strongest man)

See also

 National Register of Historic Places listings in Toombs County, Georgia
List of counties in Georgia

References

External links
  Welcome to the Georgia General Assembly . Home page. Retrieved June 10, 2013.
  Toombs County Sheriff's Office

 
Georgia (U.S. state) counties
Vidalia, Georgia, micropolitan area
1905 establishments in Georgia (U.S. state)
Populated places established in 1905